The National Civil Defence System for Disaster Prevention and Mitigation of El Salvador (in Spanish: Sistema Nacional de Protección Civil, Prevención y Mitigación de Desastres), commonly known as "Protección Civil",  is an entity created to prevent disasters or reduce their impact on society, and coordinate disaster relief efforts.

The Salvadoran Civil Defence System is part of a Central American network of governmental disaster relief agencies known as the Coordination Center for the Prevention of Natural Disasters in Central America (in Spanish: Centro de Coordinación para la Prevención de los Desastres Naturales en América Central (CEPREDENAC)). CEPREDENAC was created in the context of the Central American Integration System (SICA).

References

External links
Coordination Center for the Prevention of Natural Disasters in Central America (CEPREDENAC)
SATCA Early warning system for Central America (Sistema de Alerta Temprana para Centroamérica (SATCA))
Humanitarian Information Network for Latin America and the Caribbean (Red de Información Humanitaria  para América Latina y el Caribe (Redhum))

Government of El Salvador
Disaster management